A palampore   or (Palempore) is a type of hand-painted and mordant-dyed bed cover that was made in India for the export market during the eighteenth century and very early nineteenth century. Only the wealthiest classes could afford to buy palampore; therefore, the few examples that have survived are often quite valuable today. Palampore were primarily exported to Europe and to Dutch colonists in Indonesia and what was then called Ceylon.

A palampore was made using the kalamkari technique, whereby an artist drew designs on cotton or linen fabric with a kalam pen containing mordant and then dipped the textile in dye. The dye adhered to the cloth only where the mordant had been applied. This lengthy process had to be repeated for each color in the design. Small details were then painted by hand on the cloth after the dying process was completed. Palampore patterns were usually very complex and elaborate, depicting a wide variety of plants, flowers, and animals, including peacocks, elephants, and horses. Because a palampore was hand-created, each design is unique.

Palampore, was very popular in the Mughal and Deccan Courts. The borders of these pieces were block printed while the centre depicted intricate designs, made by hand.

References

External links 
A palampore made on India's Coromandel Coast -- now at the National Gallery of Australia
A palampore made in Madras, India -- now at the National Gallery of Australia
A palampore made on India's Coromandel Coast -- now at the Metropolitan Museum of Art

Painted fabrics
Textile arts of India
Indian inventions